Once Upon a Time in Anatolia is a 2011 internationally co-produced drama film, co-written and directed by Nuri Bilge Ceylan based on the true experience of one of the film's writers, telling the story of a group of men who search for a dead body on the Anatolian steppe.

Plot
Through the night, three cars carry a small group of menpolice officers, a doctor, a prosecutor, grave diggers, gendarmerie forces, and two brothers, homicide suspectsaround in the rural surroundings of the Anatolian town Keskin, in search of a buried body. Kenan, one of the suspects, leads them from one water fountain to another; at the time of the crime he was drunk and he cannot recall where he and his mentally challenged brother buried the body. The darkness and visual indistinctness of the landscape do not help; each spot looks the same as the others.

Meanwhile, the men discuss a variety of topics, such as yoghurt, lamb chops, urination, family, spouses, ex-wives, death, suicide, hierarchy, bureaucracy, ethics, and their jobs. Philosophy is also discussed, with one apparently central and particular idea/theme mentioned a couple of times throughout the film—the idea that children invariably pay for their parents' mistakes.

After many stops the prosecutor begins to tell the doctor about a particularly mysterious death where a woman correctly predicted to her husband the exact date of her own death, which was a short time after she had given birth to a child. The story is interrupted when the prosecutor sees some of his men lashing out at Kenan after discovering that once again they are in the wrong spot. As the group discusses what to do next, Kenan asks the doctor for a cigarette which he tries to give him. Commisar Naci stops him however and tells Kenan that he can have a cigarette when he earns it.

The group stops at a nearby village to eat at the home of the town mayor. The mayor pleads with the prosecutor to speak to the authorities of his town to help provide funds to build a morgue where bodies can be prepared. When some of the men suggest that he simply bury the bodies quickly the man informs them that emigration means that only old people are left in the town and when their children learn of their deaths they beg him not to bury the bodies immediately so that they may come back and see their parents one last time.

The wind causes a power outage during which the mayor's young daughter brings the men tea on a tray, with a lamp on the tray lighting her face. Several of the men are struck by her beauty. After seeing her Kenan begins to cry.

While waiting for the light to come back on the doctor asks about the cause of death of the woman who predicted the day of her own death. The prosecutor says it was natural, a heart attack. The doctor then asks whether an autopsy was performed, and the prosecutor replies that there was no need as the cause of death was obvious and unsuspicious. The doctor suggests that it may have been a self-induced heart attack with the use of drugs and therefore a suicide.

Meanwhile, Kenan reveals what happened the night of the killingwhile drunk he let slip the secret that the victim's son was actually his, and then things got ugly. After confessing to the comissar he is given a cigarette.

Daylight breaks. Kenan finally takes them to the correct location where the group is able to unearth the body which they discover to their horror has been hogtied. Needing to take the body to the hospital to be autopsied they realize that they do not have a body bag and that the body, now untied, had been tied by Kenan in order to make it fit in the trunk of his car. After contemplating whether to tie the body up again they succeed in making it fit by bending the corpse.

The mother and son (perhaps 12 years old) are waiting outside the hospital. The son throws a stone at Kenan hitting him between the eyes. Kenan cries.

At the hospital the prosecutor again discusses the woman who predicted her own death with the doctor. They further discuss the possibility of suicide, where it is established that a certain prescription drug could have been used to induce the heart attack. The prosecutor is familiar with the drug as his father-in-law took it for his heart problems. Possible reasons for suicide are also discussed, and the two come to a possible motive—her husband's confirmed infidelity. At the end of the discussion the prosecutor's behavior suggests that the woman may have been his own wife.

The prosecutor invites the victim's wife to identify the body in the hospital morgue, files the necessary paperwork, and departs, leaving the doctor to perform the autopsy. The autopsy reveals the presence of soil in the lungs, implying that the victim had been buried alive, but the doctor intentionally omits that from the report.

The movie ends with a shot from the doctor's perspective of the mother and son in the distance walking away with the husband's belongings. The son sees that a soccer ball has been accidentally kicked far from a schoolyard and he runs and retrieves it and kicks it back to the children in the yard. He then runs back to his mother.

Cast
 Muhammet Uzuner as Doctor Cemal
 Yılmaz Erdoğan as Police Commissar Naci
 Taner Birsel as Prosecutor Nusret
 Ahmet Mümtaz Taylan as police driver Arap Ali
 Fırat Tanış as suspect Kenan
 Ercan Kesal as mayor Muhtar
  as Cemile, Muhtar's Daughter
  as murder victim Yaşar
 Uğur Arslanoğlu as courthouse driver Tevfik
  as policeman İzzet
 Şafak Karali as courthouse clerk Abidin
 Emre Şen as gendarmerie sergeant Önder
 Burhan Yıldız as suspect Ramazan
 Nihan Okutucu as Yaşar's wife Gülnaz
 Kubilay Tunçer as autopsy technician Sakir

Production
Director Nuri Bilge Ceylan grew up in a small town similar to the one in the film in terms of mentality and hierarchy, and says he feels a close connection to the characters depicted. The story is based on real events. One of Ceylan's co-writers was an actual doctor, and, in order to attain his license, had been required to work for two years in the town where the plot is set.

The story in the film is based on very similar events the co-writer experienced during this period. The title of the film references Sergio Leone's film Once Upon a Time in the West, and was something one of the drivers uttered during the actual events. When writing the screenplay, the filmmakers tried to be as realistic as possible, and the main aim was to portray the special atmosphere, which had left a strong impression on the doctor. A number of quotations from stories by Anton Chekhov were incorporated in the script.

The film was produced through Turkey's Zeyno Film, in co-production with the Bosnian company Production2006 Sarajevo, and the Turkish companies NBC Film, 1000 Volt Post Production, the Turkish Radio and Television Corporation, Imaj and Fida Film. Filming took place during eleven weeks around Keskin, a district of the Kırıkkale Province in Central Anatolia. It was shot in the CinemaScope format.

Reception
The film has been met with critical acclaim. Review aggregation website Rotten Tomatoes gives the film a score of 94% based on 70 reviews, with an average rating of 8.2/10, while Metacritic gives a weighted average rating of 82 based on reviews from 21 critics, indicating "universal acclaim."

Dave Calhoun reviewed the film for Time Out London: "Ceylan is a sly and daring screen artist of the highest order and should draw wild praise with this new film for challenging both himself and us, the audience, with this lengthy, rigorous and masterly portrait of a night and day in the life of a murder investigation." Calhoun compared the film to the director's previous works and noted how it to a lesser extent follows genre conventions: "Displaying a new interest in words and story (albeit of the most elusive kind), Once Upon A Time in Anatolia feels like a change of direction for Ceylan and may disappoint those who were especially attracted to the urbane melancholia of Uzak and Climates. ... Beyond being chronological, the film follows no obvious storytelling pattern. Things happen when they do and at a natural rhythm. ... Ceylan invites us along for the ride – but only if we're up for it."

The film received the Cannes Film Festival's second most prestigious award, the Grand Prix, in a shared win with the film The Kid with a Bike by the Dardenne brothers.

The film was selected as Turkey's official submission for the Academy Award for Best Foreign Language Film, but did not make the shortlist.

Sight & Sound listed Once Upon a Time in Anatolia as the 8th best film of 2012. Stephen Holden of The New York Times named it the sixth best movie of 2012, and "a searching reflection on the elusiveness of truth."

In 2016, the film was named as the 54th best film of the 21st century, from a poll of 177 film critics from around the world.

Awards

See also
 2011 in film
 Cinema of Turkey
 Turkish films of 2011
 List of submissions to the 84th Academy Awards for Best Foreign Language Film
 List of Turkish submissions for the Academy Award for Best Foreign Language Film

References

External links
 Official website
 
 
 
 

2011 drama films
2011 films
Films directed by Nuri Bilge Ceylan
Films set in Turkey
Films shot in Turkey
2010s Turkish-language films
Turkish drama films
Bosnia and Herzegovina drama films
Cannes Grand Prix winners